Sidney Charles Wilcox (28 February 1893 – 21 October 1973) was a Welsh cricketer. Wilcox was a right-handed batsman who fielded as a wicket-keeper. He was born in Maesteg, Glamorgan.

Wilcox made his debut for Monmouthshire in the 1921 Minor Counties Championship against Cornwall. He played Minor counties cricket for the county from 1921 to 1934, making 90 appearances. During his career he played a single first-class match for Wales against the Minor Counties in 1930. In Wales first-innings he was dismissed for 7 runs by Eric Stroud, while in their second-innings he was unbeaten on 1. Behind the stumps he took 3 catches in the match and made a single stumping.

He died in the town of his birth on 21 October 1973.

References

External links
Sidney Wilcox at ESPNcricinfo
Sidney Wilcox at CricketArchive

1893 births
1973 deaths
Sportspeople from Maesteg
Welsh cricketers
Monmouthshire cricketers
Wales cricketers
Wicket-keepers